Kaleigh Nicole Kurtz (born September 9, 1994) is an American soccer defender who plays for the North Carolina Courage in the National Women's Soccer League and Canberra United in the Australian W-League.

Early life 
Kurtz grew up in Greer, South Carolina. She started playing soccer at the age of four in the local YMCA league, switching to the Carolina Elite Soccer Academy(CESA) when she was 9. She was a top swimmer in her division growing up, competing alongside her sister for Eastside Aquatic Club. Her family's passion towards fitness and running lead her to racing 5ks. She competed in multiple races, coming in first place for overall females 3 times. In soccer she has almost always played the position of defender, specifically centre back.  She attended high school at Riverside High school, where she was a three-year All-State winner.  Going into her junior year of high school, Kurtz broke her femur which ultimately affected her college recruiting prospects.

College career

For her freshman year of university Kurtz attended the University of Richmond during the 2013–2014 academic year.  After a season in which she started 18 games, she transferred to the University of South Carolina. Kurtz went on to make 69 appearances for the Gamecocks.  Her senior year she was named a First Team NSCAA All-American and First Team Scholar All-American, the SEC Defensive Player of the Year, and a MAC Herman Trophy Semifinalist.

Club career

Östersunds Dff

Following college, Kurtz played for Östersunds Dff in the Swedish Elitettan, fulfilling her desire to play overseas.  She made 12 appearances and captained the side.

North Carolina Courage

Kurtz was a non-roster invitee during the 2018 Carolina preseason.  She signed with the Courage in March 2018.  She debuted on April 18, 2018, starting at center back against the OL Reign. She made 6 appearances in the 2018 regular season, as well as 2 in the 2018 Women's International Champions Cup.  Kurtz' option for 2019 was picked up in October 2018.

Canberra United
Kurtz spent the NWSL off season of 2019–2020 in the Australian W-League playing in the capital for Canberra United, on loan from the North Carolina Courage. She played every minute in the 12-game season for Canberra. During round 6, Kurtz broke her nose in the run of play having to come off shortly to get fully bandaged in order to stop the bleeding, and then competing in the final minutes of the game. She was later named to the round 6 Team of the Week. She tallied one assist during her time in Australia and led the league in clearances with a total of 69 clearances during the regular season. Kurtz capped off her time in Canberra by receiving the prestigious award, 2019/2020 Canberra United Player of the Year.

Honors 

South Carolina Gamecocks
2016 SEC Defender of the Year
2016 First Team NSCAA All-American
2016 First Team NSCAA Scholar All-American

North Carolina Courage
NWSL Champions: 2018, 2019
NWSL Shield: 2018, 2019
Women's International Champions Cup Winner: 2018

Canberra United
2019/2020 Canberra United Player of the Year

Career statistics 
As of April 20, 2019

References

Social media 
Kurtz Twitter

External links 
 
 Prolife Courage

1994 births
Women's association football midfielders
Living people
National Women's Soccer League players
Soccer players from South Carolina
North Carolina Courage players
American women's soccer players
South Carolina Gamecocks women's soccer players
Richmond Spiders women's soccer players
American expatriate women's soccer players
American expatriate sportspeople in Australia
American expatriate sportspeople in Sweden
Expatriate women's footballers in Sweden
Expatriate women's soccer players in Australia
Canberra United FC players